Castle Donington Methodist Church is a Grade II listed Methodist Church in Castle Donington, Leicestershire.

History

The Methodist Church was designed by the architect Albert Edward Lambert and opened on 16 May 1906, although a Methodist church existed on the site since the early 18th century. It cost around £6,500. (equivalent to £ in ).

Future
It will close in December 2022

Organ

The church contains a two manual pipe organ. A specification of the organ can be found on the National Pipe Organ Register.

References

Methodist churches in Leicestershire
Grade II listed churches in Leicestershire
Albert Edward Lambert buildings